Romuald Halm (14 May 1918 – 17 July 2002) was an Austrian equestrian. He competed in two events at the 1956 Summer Olympics.

References

1918 births
2002 deaths
Austrian male equestrians
Olympic equestrians of Austria
Equestrians at the 1956 Summer Olympics
Place of birth missing